Living labs are open innovation ecosystems in real-life environments using iterative feedback processes throughout a lifecycle approach of an innovation to create sustainable impact. They focus on co-creation, rapid prototyping & testing and scaling-up innovations & businesses, providing (different types of) joint-value to the involved stakeholders. In this context, living labs operate as intermediaries/orchestrators among citizens, research organisations, companies and government agencies/levels.

Background
The term "living lab" has emerged in parallel from the ambient intelligence (AmI) research communities context and from the discussion on experience and application research (EAR). The emergence of the term is based on the concept of user experience and ambient intelligence.

William J. Mitchell, Kent Larson, and Alex (Sandy) Pentland at the Massachusetts Institute of Technology are credited with first exploring the concept of a Living Laboratory.  They argued that a living lab represents a user-centric research methodology for sensing, prototyping, validating and refining complex solutions in multiple and evolving real-life contexts. Nowadays, several living lab descriptions and definitions are available from different sources.

Description

A living lab is a user-centered, open-innovation ecosystem, often operating in a territorial context (e.g. city, agglomeration, region, campus), integrating concurrent research and innovation processes within a public-private-people partnership.

The concept is based on a systematic user co-creation approach integrating research and innovation processes. These are integrated through the co-creation, exploration, experimentation and evaluation of innovative ideas, scenarios, concepts and related technological artefacts in real life use cases. Such use cases involve user communities, not only as observed subjects but also as a source of creation. This approach allows all involved stakeholders to concurrently consider both the global performance of a product or service and its potential adoption by users. This consideration may be made at the earlier stage of research and development and through all elements of the product life-cycle, from design up to recycling.

User-centred research methods, such as action research, community informatics, contextual design, user-centered design, participatory design, empathic design, emotional design, and other usability methods, already exist but fail to sufficiently empower users for co-creating into open development environments. More recently, the Web 2.0 has demonstrated the positive impact of involving user communities in new product development (NPD) such as mass collaboration projects (e.g.  crowdsourcing, Wisdom of Crowds) in collectively creating new contents and applications.

A living lab is not similar to a testbed as its philosophy is to turn users, from being traditionally considered as observed subjects for testing modules against requirements, into value creation in contributing to the co-creation and exploration of emerging ideas, breakthrough scenarios, innovative concepts and related artefacts. Hence, a living lab rather constitutes an experiential environment, which could be compared to the concept of experiential learning, where users are immersed in a creative social space for designing and experiencing their own future. Living labs could also be used by policy makers and users/citizens for designing, exploring, experiencing and refining new policies and regulations in real-life scenarios for evaluating their potential impacts before their implementations.

How it works
Living labs are defined as user-centred, open innovation ecosystems based on a systematic user co-creation approach integrating research and innovation processes in real life communities and settings. In practice, living labs place the citizen at the centre of innovation, and have thus shown the ability to better mould the opportunities offered by new ICT concepts and solutions to the specific needs and aspirations of local contexts, cultures, and creativity potentials.

Living labs are organisations involving stakeholders from the quadruple helix to create a shared vision, mission and strategic goals with/for their stakeholders and define multiple different innovation projects existing out of co-creation activities.

This so-called 3-layered model was introduced by Dr. Dimitri Schuurman back in 2015. This model, part of his PhD dissertation "Bridging the gap between open and user innovation",widely used within ENoLL, the European Network of Living Labs, describes living labs as organisations existing out of 3 levels:

 On a macro level, a Living Lab is a public-private-people partnership consisting of different stakeholders, organized to carry out Living Lab research and Living Lab projects. We propose the term Living Lab constellation to refer to this level.

 On the meso level, we discern the Living Lab innovation projects that are being carried out within the Living Lab constellation. We can also refer to this as a Living Lab project.

 The research activities that are deployed in a Living Lab project we propose to label as the micro level activities in Living Labs. Mostly, this consists of a specific Living Lab methodology in order to ‘cultivate user-led insights’ and ‘surface tacit, experiential and domain-based knowledge such that it can be further codified and communicated’ (Almirall & Wareham, 2011)

Key elements of a living lab 
Within a wide variety of different living labs, all living labs use the six same building blocks. ENoLL, the European Network of Living Labs, describes them as follows:

 Orchestration: the living lab operates as the orchestrator within the ecosystem to connect and partner up with relevant stakeholders
 Multi-stakeholder participation: taking a holistic view on society, involving stakeholders from the quadruple helix model (government, academia, private sector, and citizens)
 Active user involvement: a living lab involves relevant stakeholders 'actively' in all relevant activities, ensuring their feedback is captured and implemented throughout the whole lifecycle of the innovation
 Co-creation: in a living lab, values are bottom-up co-created not only for but also by all relevant stakeholders, ensuring a higher adoption at the end
 Real-life settings: a living lab operates in the real-life setting of the end users, infusing innovations into their real life instead of moving the users to test sites to explore the innovations
 Multi method approach: each living lab activity is problem driven. Therefore, the methodological approach towards every individual activity will be selected based on the expected outcomes of the activity and the stakeholders who needs to be involved.

Types of living labs 
From a conceptual perspective at the moment we identify 4 ‘types’ of living labs:

 Urban & Rural Living Labs: Opening the city/region as a site for experimentation (+) co-creation, active user engagement, real-life  settings experimentation, multi-stakeholders, multi-method.
 Research driven living lab (research focused): from out different topics of research this type of living labs are dealing with co-creating models for solving problems
 Living testbed (provider focused): this type of Living lab focuses on the development of new technologies and the  acceptance of it by society via demonstration projects (e.g. House/Farm of the future, Industry 4.0 labs
 Living Labs as a service (for SME’s & start ups): offering general LL tools & methodologies to companies to help them accelerate their innovation funnels

Most living labs combine several types, but their focus is on one of the above.

European Network of Living Labs 
The European Network of Living Labs (ENoLL) is an international non-profit association (founded in 2007) which aims to promote and enhance user-driven innovation ecosystems,

more precise the Living Labs globally.

ENoLL focuses on facilitating knowledge exchange, joint actions and project partnerships among its historically labelled +/- 500 members, influencing EU policies, promoting living labs and enabling their implementation worldwide.

MIT Living Labs/City Science/Media Lab 
From 2004 to 2007, the MIT House_n Consortium (now City Science), directed by Kent Larson, created and operated the PlaceLab, a residential living laboratory located in a multi-family apartment building in Cambridge. Massachusetts. The PlaceLab was, at the time, the most highly instrumented living environment ever created.  Hundreds of sensors and semi-automated activity recognition allowed researchers to determine where occupants were, what they were doing, the systems they interacted with, and the state of the environment.  Volunteer occupants lived in the facility for weeks at a time to test the effectiveness of proactive health systems related to diet, exercise, medication adherence, and other interventions.  Kent Larson, Stephen Intille, Emmanuel Munguia Tapia, and other PlaceLab researchers twice received the “10-Year Impact Award” from Ubicomp: a “test of time” award for work that, with the benefit of that hindsight, has had the greatest impact.  This work was followed by BoxLab, a home furniture object that captured and processed sensor data in the home, and CityHome, which integrated architectural robotics into furniture to effortless transform space from sleeping to socializing to working to dining (now launched commercially as ORI Living).

In 2010, Mitchell, Larson and Pentland, formed the first US-based living labs research consortium. According to the consortium website:

The convergence of globalization, changing demographics, and urbanization is transforming almost every aspect of our lives.  We face new choices about where and how we work, live, travel, communicate, and maintain health.  Ultimately, our societies are being transformed.  MIT Living Labs brings together interdisciplinary experts to develop, deploy, and test - in actual living environments - new technologies and strategies for design that respond to this changing world.  Our work spans in scale from the personal to the urban, and addresses challenges related to health, energy, and creativity.

The consortium has since been reorganized as the City Science Initiative at the MIT Media Lab, within the School of Architecture + Planning. There is now an international network of City Science Labs at Tongji University (Shanghai), Taipei Tech (Taipei), HafenCity University (Hamburg), Aalto University (Helsinki), ActuaTech (Andorra), and Toronto Metropolitan University (Toronto).

, Larson is Director of the City Science Initiative at the MIT Media Lab. and Pentland is Professor of Media Arts and Sciences, and MIT Media Lab Entrepreneurship Program Director (also within the School of Architecture + Planning). He has recently formed a partnership with the South Australian Government to set up a living lab in the Lot Fourteen hub, similar to MIT Living Labs in New York City, Beijing and Istanbul.

See also
 Business cluster
 Citilab
 Concurrent engineering
 Context awareness
 Human-computer interaction
 Information science
 Social computing

References

External links
 Peer-reviewed Technology Innovation Management Review special issue 2012 on living labs (open access journal)
 Eskelinen, Jarmo, García Robles, Ana, Lindy, Ilari, Marsh, Jesse, Muente-Kunigami, Arturo, Editors, 2015. Citizen-Driven Innovation – A Guidebook for City Mayors and Public Administrators. World Bank and ENoLL.

Design
Innovation
Collaboration
Usability
Human–computer interaction
Applied psychology
Information science